Nile Marr (born 21 February 1992) is a British musician and songwriter. After forming part of a trio named Man Made, he released his debut solo album Are You Happy Now? in 2020.

He is the son of musician Johnny Marr.

Career
Marr started out as a solo artist, then as a duo with American singer-songwriter Meredith Sheldon, and then in the trio Man Made, alongside drummer Scott Griffiths and bassist Callum Rogers, with future tour manager for Blossoms, Dan Woolfie, as their sound engineer. They released their debut album TV Broke My Brain in 2016, although its constituent songs were written over a period of eight years.

Marr released a debut solo album in 2020, titled Are You Happy Now? "Part Time Girl" was released as its first single in 2019. "Are You Happy Now?" followed in June 2020, and "Teenage Kissers" in October.

An EP, Still Hearts, was released on 24 April 2020. "Still Hearts" was its first single. Aside from the title track, there are two other tracks: "Hush" and "The Pusher".

Marr added acoustic guitar and backing vocals on 7 Worlds Collide's 2009 album The Sun Came Out. He has also appeared on two of his father's albums: on 2013's The Messenger he plays as a soloist, while on 2014's Playland he adds backing vocals.

Marr has toured extensively with German film score composer and record producer Hans Zimmer.

His influences include John Martyn, Fugazi and Elliott Smith.

Discography

Man Made
Albums
TV Broke My Brain (2016)

Solo
Albums
Are You Happy Now? (2020)

EPs
Still Hearts (2020)

Singles
"Part Time Girl" (from Are You Happy Now?; 2019)
"Still Hearts" (from Still Hearts; 2020)
"Are You Happy Now?" (Are You Happy Now?; 2020)
"Teenage Kissers" (Are You Happy Now?; 2020)
"Plastic Valves for an Open Heart" (special edition; 2021)
"How We Drift"/"Only Time Can Break Your Heart" (2021)

Personal life
Marr is the son of former Smiths guitarist and current solo artist Johnny Marr and his wife Angela. He was named for one of his father's musical heroes, Chic's Nile Rodgers. He has a sister, Sonny.

Marr attended Oakfield Nursery School in Altrincham, Cheshire. His family moved to Portland, Oregon, between 2005 and 2010. He returned permanently to his hometown of Manchester in 2018.

As of June 2019, Marr was married.

Notes

References

1992 births
Living people
English rock guitarists
English male guitarists
English songwriters
English male singers
English people of Irish descent
Musicians from Manchester
British male songwriters